Maldivian is the airline division of Island Aviation Services and is based in Malé, in the Maldives. It is the flag carrier airline of the Maldives. It operates international flights in addition to inter-island services. Its main base is Velana International Airport.

History
On 23 April 2009, the Government under a Presidential decree incorporated Island Aviation Services Limited as a limited liability company, one hundred percent owned by the Government of Maldives. The airline began operations with three aircraft; a Bombardier Dash 8 Q200; and a Dornier 228, and served only domestic airports within the Maldives. The airline commenced its international flights on 26 January 2008 with scheduled flights to Thiruvananthapuram, India. On 25 August 2008, the airline division of Island Aviation Services was re-branded as Maldivian.

Flight Q27100, a Viking Air De Havilland DHC-6-200 aircraft with registration marks 8Q-IAG, suffered an accident during three failed take-off attempts at Nature’s Paradise Island at 0926 hours on 16 November 2017. The aircraft had 12 passengers and three crew members destined to Velana International Airport. The aircraft experienced substantial damage.

Destinations
Maldivian flies to the following destinations on scheduled domestic and international service as of October 2019:

Dhaka – Shahjalal International Airport
 (Charter) 
Chengdu – Chengdu Shuangliu International Airport
Chongqing – Chongqing Jiangbei International Airport
Nanjing – Nanjing Lukou International Airport
Wuhan – Wuhan Tianhe International Airport
Xi'an – Xi'an Xianyang International Airport
Hangzhou – Hangzhou Xiaoshan International Airport

Kochi – Cochin International Airport
Thiruvananthapuram – Trivandrum International Airport

Malé – Velana International Airport Hub
Addu Atoll – Gan International Airport
Baa Atoll – Dharavandhoo Airport
Gaafu Alif Atoll – Kooddoo Airport
Gaafu Dhaalu Atoll – Kaadedhdhoo Airport
Gnaviyani Atoll – Fuvahmulah Airport
Haa Dhaalu Atoll – Hanimaadhoo International Airport and the airport in Kulhudhuffushi
Laamu Atoll – Kadhdhoo Airport
Raa Atoll – Ifuru Airport 
Thaa Atoll – Thimarafushi Airport
Dhaalu Atoll – Dhaalu Airport
Shaviyani Atoll - Funadhoo Airport

Colombo – Colombo International Airport, Ratmalana

Bangkok – Suvarnabhumi International Airport

 Resorts Operated by – Maldivian Seaplane

Raa Atoll – Kudafushi Island Resort
Baa Atoll – Anathara Kihavahuravalhi
Baa Atoll – Four Seasons Private Island
Baa Atoll – Vakkaru Island Resort 
Baa Atoll – Hirundu Island Resort 
Noonu Atoll – Robinson Club Noonu 
Dhaalu Atoll – Niyaama Private Islands
Dhaalu Atoll – Kandima Island Resort
Dhaalu Atoll – Doores Island Retreat
Dhaalu Atoll – Maagau Island Resort 
Thaa Atoll – Maalifushi Island Resort

Fleet 
Maldivian operates the following aircraft (as of January 2023).

Livery

The first livery used by the airline (as Island Aviation) featured a wave pattern along the bottom of the fuselage along with 2 dolphins and 2 tuna fish. The logo was placed in the center of the tail. Along with the re-branding of Maldivian, a new livery was introduced. The new livery saw the removal of the wave pattern to a plain white fuselage, and the addition of a blue wave, with one dolphin jumping out of the water on the tail of the aircraft.

Other services
As of July 2016, Island Aviation Services provide the following services at all public airports of the Maldives.

 Aircraft Engineering Services
 Ground Control
 Flight Operations
 Aerodrome Operation

Lounges
Maldivian operates 3 lounges in Maldives; Moonimaa lounge at Malé and Kashimaa lounges at both Hanimaadhoo and Dharavandhoo airports.

References

External links

Maldivian

Airlines of the Maldives
Airlines established in 2000
Malé
2000 establishments in Asia
Former seaplane operators